The Hinderers is Dååth's second studio album produced by Dååth and James Murphy, and released by Roadrunner Records. It contains guest solos by James Murphy and James Malone (of Arsis). Two music videos were produced, one each for the songs "Subterfuge" and "Festival Mass Soulform".

Track listing

Personnel
Sean Farber - vocals
Mike Kameron - keyboards, backing vocals
Emil Werstler - guitar
Eyal Levi - guitar
Jeremy Creamer - bass
Kevin Talley - drums
Colin Richardson - mixing

Guest appearances
James Murphy (ex-Death, ex-Testament, ex-Obituary) - guitar solo on track 9.
James Malone (of Arsis) - guitar solo on track 12.

References

2007 albums
Dååth albums
Roadrunner Records albums